Brandwag (also Brandwacht) is a town in Mossel Bay Local Municipality in the Western Cape province of South Africa.

References

Populated places in the Mossel Bay Local Municipality